Luteimonas aestuarii is a species of yellow-pigmented bacteria. It is Gram-negative and rod-shaped, and its type strain is B9(T) (= KCTC 22048(T), DSM 19680(T)).

References

Further reading
Whitman, William B., et al., eds. Bergey’s Manual® of Systematic Bacteriology. Vol. 2. Springer, 2012.

External links

LPSN
Type strain of Luteimonas aestuarii at BacDive -  the Bacterial Diversity Metadatabase

Xanthomonadales
Gram-negative bacteria
Bacteria described in 2009